City of Milwaukee may refer to:

 the city of Milwaukee, Wisconsin
 , a great lakes car ferry named for the city